2012 BNP Paribas Open – Men's doubles was a professional tennis tournament played at Indian Wells, California.

Alexandr Dolgopolov and Xavier Malisse were the defending champions, but lost in the second round to Marc López and Rafael Nadal, who went on to win the title against John Isner and Sam Querrey 6–2, 7–6(7–3) in the final. López and Nadal did not lose a single set in the entire tournament.

Seeds

Draw

Finals

Top half

Bottom half

References
Main Draw

BNP Paribas Open - Men's Doubles
2012 BNP Paribas Open